On 25 May 1921, during the Irish War of Independence, the Custom House in Dublin was occupied and then burnt in an operation by the Irish Republican Army (IRA). The Custom House was the headquarters of the Local Government Board for Ireland, an agency of the British administration in Ireland, against which the IRA was fighting in the name of the self-proclaimed Irish Republic. The operation, involving over 100 IRA volunteers, was a propaganda coup for the republicans but a military disaster for the IRA in the Irish capital. A force of British Auxiliaries quickly arrived and a gun battle erupted. Five IRA volunteers were killed (John Doyle, Edward Dorins, Daniel Head, Captain Patrick & Lieutenant Stephen O'Reilly), along with three civilians, and about 80 volunteers were captured.

Background
The Irish War of Independence was a guerrilla campaign by the IRA in support of the Irish Republic. The conflict entered its bloodiest phase in the first six months of 1921. In Dublin, a total of 309 people were killed in the conflict and several hundred more wounded.

Dublin was garrisoned by over 10,000 British troops and 1,600 police including 400 men of the RIC Auxiliary Division. Most IRA actions in the city consisted either of assassinations of selected police, military or administration figures by the Squad, or ambushes on British forces by one of the four Active Service Units of the IRA's Dublin Brigade (together comprising about 100 men). These were usually rapid and fleeting attacks using grenades and handguns, followed by a quick getaway. There were strict orders given to IRA units to avoid prolonged engagements with the better-armed British forces.

However, this policy was reversed after a meeting of the Ministry of Dáil Éireann in May 1921 where the President of the Republic, Éamon de Valera, called for a spectacular public show of force by the IRA, to reinforce the idea that it was an army representing an Irish government. For this reason it was decided to attack and burn the Custom House, which, although an important government building, was not defended by the British military. Michael Collins was against the attack but was overruled.

Michael O'Kelly, Lieutenant E Company, 2nd Battalion, Dublin Brigade, recalled plans to "deliver a smashing blow to England". Two large scale operations - to capture Beggars Bush Barracks, or to destroy the Customs House were initially considered. The Custom House was eventually chosen. IRA member Vincent Byrne said that the operation was "one of many under review" and that another proposal had been to attack Beggars Bush Barracks.

The attack
In the early afternoon of 25 May 1921, roughly 120 non-uniformed IRA Volunteers began to gather around the Custom House in groups of twos and threes. 75 percent of those involved belonged to the 2nd Battalion of the Dublin Brigade under Tom Ennis. Only a minority of them were experienced guerrilla fighters and they were armed only with pistols and a limited amount of ammunition. At 1 p.m., they rushed the Custom House and overpowered the police guard. A lorry pulled-up outside the building with tins of petrol and bales of cotton, which were then sprinkled throughout the building. The IRA Volunteers herded all the staff into the main hall. The caretaker of the building (Francis Davis) was shot dead when he tried to call the police.

However, at about 1.10pm, a watching policeman notified British forces and 60 Auxiliaries in three lorries and an armored car quickly arrived on the scene. IRA Volunteers from the 1st, 3rd and 4th battalions were positioned outside the building to stop the enemy from approaching.

Four Auxiliaries were wounded in a gun battle with one of these IRA protection teams outside the building. Other Auxiliaries fired into the building with rifles and Lewis machine guns, exchanging fire with the IRA fighters inside. A number of IRA Volunteers and civilians were killed or wounded by the Auxiliaries. As fighting raged outside, IRA Volunteers inside the building were ordered to set it alight.

The ammunition of the IRA Volunteers quickly ran out and the firefight ended within 30 minutes. Some Volunteers were shot as they tried to run away. Tom Ennis, in command of the operation, escaped but was hit twice in the leg. Many others were arrested along with civilians as they came out of the now burning Custom House with their hands up. The Fire Brigade, which had been delayed from responding by other IRA companies in the city, arrived too late to put out the fire.

British military forces composed of units from the Wiltshire Regiment arrived and took over the operation from the Auxiliaries at this point. A total of 111 people were arrested, of whom 70–80 were IRA members.

The Custom House burned for five days and was all but completely destroyed by the fire. With it were destroyed many centuries of local government records. The Irish Bulletin, official gazette of the Irish Republic, reported:

Aftermath
From the republican point of view, the operation was successful for its propaganda value, but it was a heavy blow in terms of the numbers lost, both killed and arrested. Following the operation, the Dublin Brigade and The Squad were amalgamated into the Dublin Guard. However, the operation did not totally impede the IRA's campaign in Dublin. The Dublin Brigade carried out 107 attacks in the city in May and 93 in June, showing a fall-off but not a dramatic one.

The memoir of Harry Colley, Adjutant of the Dublin IRA, estimated the numbers in the 5 Dublin battalions at 1,400 in early 1921.

The armed conflict was brought to an end on 11 July 1921 and negotiations were opened which would produce the Anglo-Irish Treaty in December of that year. The Custom House was re-built after the end of the war.

Irish local government records from the 1600s had been brought from rural parts of Ireland to the Custom House for safekeeping, and these were lost in the blaze. As the time, The New York Times subtitled their report on the fire as "Priceless Records Lost". Some genealogists still lament the loss of these historical records.

References

1921 in Ireland
History of Dublin (city)
Custom House
Royal Irish Constabulary
May 1921 events
1920s in Dublin (city)
1920s crimes in the Irish Free State